1L-myo-inositol 1-phosphate cytidylyltransferase (CTP:inositol-1-phosphate cytidylyltransferase (bifunctional CTP:inositol-1-phosphate cytidylyltransferase/CDP-inositol:inositol-1-phosphate transferase (IPCT/DIPPS)), IPCT (bifunctional CTP:inositol-1-phosphate cytidylyltransferase/CDP-inositol:inositol-1-phosphate transferase (IPCT/DIPPS)), L-myo-inositol-1-phosphate cytidylyltransferase) is an enzyme with systematic name CTP:1L-myo-inositol 1-phosphate cytidylyltransferase. This enzyme catalyses the following chemical reaction

 CTP + 1L-myo-inositol 1-phosphate  diphosphate + CDP-1L-myo-inositol

This enzyme is involved in biosynthesis of bis(1L-myo-inositol) 1,3'-phosphate.

References

External links 

EC 2.7.7